Maria Ana of Braganza (Maria Ana Francisca Josefa Rita Joana; 7 October 1736 – 16 May 1813), was a Portuguese infanta daughter of King Joseph I of Portugal and his wife Mariana Victoria of Spain.

Biography 
The infanta was born in Lisbon on October 7, 1736 and was the second of four daughters of Joseph I. 

She was considered a potential bride for Louis, Dauphin of France, but her mother refused to consent to the marriage because of her own history, having been bethrothed by Louis XV, who had broken their engagement and sent her back from France. She never married, but engaged in her interests in the arts and in the rebuildning of the famous covent school Convento do Desagravo do Santíssimo Sacramento in Lisbon, which had been destroyed in the famous earthquake of 1757, and which she was able to re-inaguerate in 1783. 

She escaped from mainland Portugal with her family when Napoleon Bonaparte ordered the invasion of Portugal. Like her sister the queen, she suffered from a mental illness during her last years, and was cared for in Brazil by her sister Benedita, who lived with her.  She died in Rio de Janeiro on May 16, 1813 and was moved to Lisbon.

References

1736 births
1813 deaths
Portuguese infantas
18th-century Portuguese people
19th-century Portuguese people
18th-century Portuguese women
19th-century Portuguese women
Burials at the Monastery of São Vicente de Fora
Dames of the Order of Saint Isabel
House of Braganza
People from Lisbon
Royal reburials
Daughters of kings